Kurt Moeschter (28 March 1903 – 26 June 1959) was a German rower who won a gold medal in the coxless pairs at the 1928 Summer Olympics, together with Bruno Müller.

References

External links
 

1903 births
1959 deaths
Olympic rowers of Germany
Rowers at the 1928 Summer Olympics
Olympic gold medalists for Germany
Olympic medalists in rowing
German male rowers
Medalists at the 1928 Summer Olympics